Juan Valdelmira de León (c.1630–c.1660) was a Spanish painter known for his still-life paintings of fruit and flowers. He was born in Navarre. He was instructed  by his father at Valladolid, and after his death entered the school of Francisco Rizi at Madrid. He assisted that master in several of his works, particularly in the Portuguese church at Toledo, in the Retiro, and other places. But his chief excellence was in flowerpieces. He died in his thirtieth year.

References

1630s births
1660s deaths
17th-century Spanish painters
Spanish male painters
Spanish Baroque painters
Spanish bodegón painters